The Wichita Train Whistle Sings is the de facto first solo album by Michael Nesmith, although the artist credited on the initial release is actually "The Wichita Train Whistle".  It was recorded while Nesmith was still a member of the Monkees, and it peaked at No. 144 on the Billboard Pop Albums charts.

The album comprises instrumentals performed by a full orchestra. All but one of the songs were also recorded by the Monkees (although a few of them weren't released until the Monkees' Missing Links albums.)

Background
The album was made over a two-day session on November 18–19, 1967 at the RCA studios in Hollywood, and it featured the best musicians in Hollywood (including many of the key members of "The Wrecking Crew"), including ten trumpets, ten trombones, ten saxophones, two drummers, five percussionists, four pianos, eight basses, seven guitars. Because it was the weekend, all musicians were paid double time and the session was catered by Chasens, the finest restaurant in Hollywood, and Nesmith provided an open bar, with the predictable result that most of the normally highly disciplined cadre of studio musicians were drunk by the time the session finished. It all cost $50,000. Nesmith explained to Hal Blaine that he was about to pay a similar sum in tax and he would rather spend it on the sessions and write it off than give it to the IRS.

The recording is also notable for the famous incident that occurred at the end of the sessions: the lead sheet for the final track recorded ("Don't Call On Me") included an instruction that called for the players to improvise a cacophony of sound; as the track concluded, to the astonishment of his colleagues, renowned guitarist Tommy Tedesco took off his Fender guitar (which was still plugged into the amplifier), threw it high into the air, and the instrument crashed to the floor and smashed to pieces. According to a 2000 interview with Hal Blaine, Tedesco's wife later collected the pieces and had them framed.

The album was initially released with the title Mike Nesmith Presents The Wichita Train Whistle Sings on both the sleeve and record label.  The label credited the recording artist as "The Wichita Train Whistle".

In 1977, Nesmith re-released The Wichita Train Whistle Sings through his multimedia company, Pacific Arts (PACB 7-113). Unlike the original Dot Records black background album cover, the Pacific Arts cover had a white background and was dominated with only the album title, which now did not include the Mike Nesmith Presents notation.  However, although Nesmith's name did not appear on the front cover of the re-release, the artist credit on the actual record label now read "Michael Nesmith", and not "The Wichita Train Whistle".  Subsequent re-issues also credit Nesmith as the artist.

CD Release
When Nesmith released "Wichita Train" on CD, he recorded the album onto digital from a phonograph.  As he explained in the liner notes, the album was intended to be played on vinyl, and this, therefore, was an attempt to capture the album's true essence.

In 2008, the album was remixed from the original multi-track tapes, re-sequenced (by Nesmith), and re-released on the Edsel label alongside his Timerider movie soundtrack.

Track listing
All songs by Michael Nesmith except where noted.
 "Nine Times Blue"
 "Carlisle Wheeling"
 "Tapioca Tundra"
 "Don't Call on Me"
 "Don't Cry Now"
 "While I Cried"
 "Papa Gene's Blues"
 "You Just May Be the One"
 "Sweet Young Thing" (Nesmith, Gerry Goffin, Carole King)
 "You Told Me"

Personnel
Michael Nesmith – guitar, bass, arranger
Don Randi – piano
Red Rhodes – pedal steel guitar
Larry Knechtel – piano
Earl Palmer – drums
Doug Dillard – banjo
Chuck Berghofer – bass
Hal Blaine – drums
James Burton – guitar
Tommy Tedesco – guitar
Frank Capp - percussion
Nelson Stump - cowbell
Gary Coleman - percussion
Victor Feldman - percussion
Israel Baker (concertmaster), Robert Barene, Arnold Belnick, Jimmy Getzoff, Leonard Malarsky, Ralph Schaeffer, Sidney Sharp (concertmaster), Tibor Zelig - violins
Joe DiFiore, Harry Hyams, Alexander Neiman - violas
Jesse Ehrlich, Ray Kramer, Edgar Lustgarten - celli
Gene Cipriano, Justin Gordon, Jim Horn, Jules Jacob, John E. Lowe, Jack Nimitz - saxophones and other woodwinds
John Audino, Bud Brisbois, Jules Chaikin, Buddy Childers, Manny Klein, Oliver Mitchell, Tony Terran, Jimmy Zito - trumpets
Milt Bernhart, Lou Blackburn, Joe Howard, Dick Hyde, Lou McCreary, Barrett O'Hara, Kenny Shroyer - trombones
Jim Decker, Vincent DeRosa, Bill Hinshaw, Richard Perissi - French horns
Sam Rice, John Kitzmiller - tubas

Production notes
Michael Nesmith – producer, arranger 
Hank Cicalo – engineer
Israel Baker – concertmaster
Shorty Rogers – arranger, conductor
Sid Sharp – concert master
Jerry Takigawa — Album cover design

References

1968 debut albums
Michael Nesmith albums
Dot Records albums
Albums conducted by Shorty Rogers
Albums arranged by Shorty Rogers
Albums produced by Michael Nesmith
Albums arranged by Michael Nesmith